The 1888 North Carolina Tar Heels football team represented the University of North Carolina in the 1888 college football season.  They played four games with a final record of 1–3.  This was the first season the university fielded a football team. The team captains for the 1888 season were Bob Bingham and Steve Bragaw. The game against Wake Forest College was the first in the state, and the game against Trinity College the first "scientific" game in the state. Either is the first intercollegiate game in North Carolina. Princeton star Hector Cowan traveled south at the beginning of 1889 and trained the team for 10-days and was paid $300 the student body collected for that purpose.

After the November 29 contest with Trinity the two schools, along with Wake Forest College, formed the North Carolina Inter-Collegiate Football Association.

Schedule

See also
 List of the first college football game in each US state

References

North Carolina
North Carolina Tar Heels football seasons
North Carolina Tar Heels football